Simpson is a village in the Canadian province of Saskatchewan within the Rural Municipality of Wood Creek No. 281 and Census Division No. 11. It is between the cities of Regina and Saskatoon on Highway 2. The administrative office for the Rural Municipality of Wood Creek No. 281 is located in the village. The post office was founded in 1911 by Herman Bergren and Joseph Newman during construction of the Canadian Pacific Railway. It is named after George Simpson, a governor of the Hudson's Bay Company.

History 
The early 1904 pioneer homestead settlers were George, John and Robert Simpson, Bill Grieve, William Cole, and E.C. Howie. Simpson incorporated as a village on July 11, 1911.

Geography
Last Mountain Lake Sanctuary, North America's oldest sanctuary for birds, is a nearby tourist attraction.  Last Mountain Lake National Wildlife Area, Last Mountain Lake Wildlife Management Unit, and Last Mountain Regional Park are all conservation areas near Simpson on Long Lake or Last Mountain Lake.
Manitou Beach, located on a salt water lake - the land of healing waters - and the historic Danceland dance hall are located near Simpson at Watrous.  This is also a major tourist attraction for the area.

Sites of interest
The previous Wood Creek No. 281 Rural Municipality Office was designated on April 5, 1982, as a municipal heritage site and now houses the Simpson district museum.

Demographics 

See also
List of communities in Saskatchewan
List of rural municipalities in Saskatchewan
Simpson Flyers

References

Further reading
Simpson and Imperial year book 1980.

Villages in Saskatchewan
Division No. 11, Saskatchewan